Wigry  is a small village in the administrative district of Gmina Suwałki, within Suwałki County, Podlaskie Voivodeship, in north-eastern Poland, a short-lived former Roman Catholic bishopric and presently a Latin Catholic titular see.

Village 

The village has a population of 30.

Ecclesiastical history 
The Diocese of Wigry was established on 25 March 1798 on territories split off from the then dioceses of Žemaitija (now Metropolitan Archdiocese of Kaunas) and Vilnius (now also Metropolitan Archdiocese) and former Luck (merged).

It was suppressed on 30 June 1818, after only two incumbents, its territory being reassigned to establish the Diocese of Sejny, to which its last incumbent was appointed.

Episcopal Ordinaries 
(all Roman Rite)

Suffragan Bishops of Wigry
 Michal Franciszek Karpowicz, Vincentians (C.M.) (1799.03.28 – death 1803.11.05)
 Jan Klemens Gołaszewski (1805.06.26 – 1818.06.30), later first Bishop of Sejny (1818.06.30 – 1820.03.08).

Titular see 
It was nominally restored in October 2014 as a Latin Catholic titular bishopric.

So far it has had a single incumbent, of the lowest (episcopal) rank :
 Marek Szkudło (2014.12.13 – ...), Auxiliary Bishop of Katowice (Poland)

See also 
 List of Catholic dioceses in Poland

References

Sources and external links 
 GigaCatholic with incumbent biography links

Villages in Suwałki County